Luke Skywalker is a fictional character and the protagonist of the original film trilogy of the Star Wars franchise created by George Lucas. Portrayed by Mark Hamill, Luke first appeared in Star Wars (1977), and he returned in The Empire Strikes Back (1980) and Return of the Jedi (1983). Over three decades later, Hamill returned as Luke in the Star Wars sequel trilogy, cameoing in The Force Awakens (2015) before playing a major role in The Last Jedi (2017) and The Rise of Skywalker (2019). He later played a digitally de-aged version of the character in the Disney+ series The Mandalorian, appearing in the second-season finale, which premiered in 2020, and The Book of Boba Fett, in the sixth episode, released in 2022.

Originally a farmer on Tatooine living with his uncle and aunt, Luke becomes a pivotal figure in the Rebel Alliance's struggle against the Galactic Empire. The son of fallen Jedi Knight Anakin Skywalker (turned Sith Lord Darth Vader) and Padmé Amidala, Luke is the twin brother of Rebellion leader Princess Leia and eventual brother-in-law of the smuggler Han Solo. Luke trains to be a Jedi under Jedi Masters Obi-Wan Kenobi and Yoda and rebuilds the Jedi Order. He later trains his nephew Ben Solo and mentors Rey. Though Luke dies at the end of The Last Jedi, he returns as a Force spirit in The Rise of Skywalker, encouraging Rey to face her grandfather, the resurrected Emperor Palpatine. At the end of the film, the spirits of Luke and Leia give Rey their blessing to adopt the Skywalker surname and continue their family's legacy.

The character also briefly appears in the prequel film Episode III – Revenge of the Sith as an infant, portrayed by Aidan Barton, and in the Disney+ series Obi-Wan Kenobi as a child, portrayed by Grant Feely. In the de-canonized Star Wars Expanded Universe (renamed Legends), Luke is a main character in many stories set after Return of the Jedi, which depict him as a powerful Jedi Master, the husband of Mara Jade, father of Ben Skywalker, and maternal uncle of Jaina, Jacen and Anakin Solo.

Concept and creation
Series creator George Lucas considered various characterizations for the protagonist of the original Star Wars film. This included a 60-year-old grizzled war hero, a Jedi master, a dwarf, and a woman.<ref>Lucas, George (2004). The Characters of 'Star Wars, Star Wars Trilogy DVD. 20th Century Fox Home Entertainment. Event occurs at 3:45.</ref> In an interview about his early drafts, Lucas said:
The first [version] talked about a princess and an old general. The second version involved a father, his son, and his daughter; the daughter was the heroine of the film. Now the daughter has become Luke, Mark Hamill's character. There was also the story of two brothers where I transformed one of them into a sister. The older brother was imprisoned, and the young sister had to rescue him and bring him back to their dad.

Though Luke's surname was "Skywalker" in Lucas's 1973 treatment of The Star Wars, it was changed to "Starkiller" in subsequent drafts, at one point featuring in the title (The Star Wars: From the Adventures of Luke Starkiller). The "Starkiller" surname remained for the first few months of production; Hamill used the name "Luke Starkiller" the sole time he referred to himself during filming, in a scene during which a stormtrooper helmet obscures his mouth; this was dubbed "Skywalker" in the film. "Starkiller" was dropped due to what Lucas called "unpleasant connotations" with Charles Manson.

In an alternative ending pitched by Lucas for the Star Wars trilogy's final film, Return of the Jedi (1983), Luke assumed his father's role as Darth Vader after the latter's death and intending to rule in his place. Though Lawrence Kasdan favored the idea, Lucas ultimately declined, since the films were made for children. Another conclusion to the film featured the character disappearing into the wilderness akin to "Clint Eastwood in the spaghetti westerns."

Later, George Lucas would expand the character upon the prophecy revealed in the prequel trilogy. Like his father, the Chosen One, Skywalker possessed a uniquely powerful connection to the Force and became one of the most powerful Force wielders in galactic history. Indeed, in Empire Strikes Back, Darth Sidious expresses the belief that Skywalker was strong enough in the Force to destroy the Sith. Even George Lucas himself has stated Luke Skywalker is the most powerful Jedi in the galactic history.

According to Mark Hamill, during the filming of the original film, Lucas asked him if he would reprise the role for a cameo when he was in his 60s to pass the torch to the next generation. In 1983, Hamill stated that his return to the franchise would be "either be another plane of existence or not the same character". Hamill learned of the sequel trilogy in mid-2012 at a Star Wars Celebration during lunch when Lucas told him one was in development.

Luke's lack of screen time in The Force Awakens was due to concerns by screenwriter Michael Arndt that his presence would mean the audience would have less interest in protagonist Rey, leading to an agreement that he be removed from the screen and instead become a plot device. Hamill attended meetings for script readings, and helped conceal Luke's role in the film; instead of dialogue, he read stage directions. According to director and co-writer J. J. Abrams, this allowed Hamill to remain involved and his reading helped make a "better experience for everyone".

After filming The Force Awakens, Hamill shaved his beard to portray the Trickster in The Flash, then let it grow back to film The Last Jedi. According to concept designer Christian Alzmann, Luke's appearance in that film was partly inspired by that of Colonel Kurtz in Apocalypse Now (1979).

Appearances
Skywalker saga

Original trilogy

In the original Star Wars trilogy, Luke Skywalker represents the hero archetype of "the young man, called to adventure, the hero going out facing the trials and ordeals, and coming back after his victory with a boon for the community".

A New Hope (1977) 

In a deleted scene preceding the character's first appearance in the film (preserved in the film's radio dramatization), Luke says goodbye to his best friend Biggs Darklighter, who has just joined the Imperial Academy. His childhood friends disparagingly call him "Wormie".

In the original 1977 film (later having the extended title, A New Hope), Luke lives at a moisture farm on the desert planet of Tatooine with his uncle Owen and aunt Beru. Luke takes his first steps toward his destiny when he purchases the droids  and R2-D2. While examining R2-D2, he sees a message from Princess Leia Organa of Alderaan. When R2-D2 goes missing, Luke goes out to search for the droid, and is saved from a band of Tusken Raiders by Obi-Wan Kenobi, an old hermit. Luke and Obi-Wan retreat to the latter's home, and R2-D2 plays the full message for Obi-Wan from Leia, beseeching him to help her defeat the Galactic Empire. Obi-Wan says that he and Luke's father were once Jedi Knights, and that his father was murdered by a traitorous Jedi named Darth Vader. Obi-Wan presents Luke with his father's lightsaber and offers to take him to Alderaan and train him in the ways of the Force, but Luke declines his offer, feeling obligated to his family's farm.

Luke changes his mind when he returns home to find out that Imperial stormtroopers have raided the moisture farm, killing his aunt and uncle. He and Obi-Wan then travel to Mos Eisley, where they meet smugglers Han Solo and Chewbacca at a cantina. They team up and travel on the Millennium Falcon to Alderaan, only to find out that it has been destroyed by the Death Star, the Empire's battle station. The Falcon is brought into the Death Star's hangar bay via tractor beam, where Luke and Han disguise themselves as stormtroopers and infiltrate the station. When they discover Princess Leia is there, Luke persuades a reluctant Han and Chewbacca to help rescue her. Obi-Wan deactivates the tractor beam, and he later sacrifices his life in a duel with Vader, so that Luke and his friends can board the Falcon and escape.

During the Battle of Yavin, Luke joins the Rebel Alliance in attacking the Death Star. In the trench leading to the Death Star's exhaust port, Luke hears Obi-Wan's voice, telling him to "trust his feelings"; he takes Obi-Wan's advice and switches off his X-wing's missile guidance system, instead using the Force to guide the missiles and destroy the Death Star. In the film's final scene, he joins Han and Chewbacca in receiving a medal of honor for his heroism.

The Empire Strikes Back (1980)

Three years after the destruction of the Death Star, Luke is now the commander of the Rebel Alliance's Rogue Squadron. While on a mission on the ice planet Hoth, he is captured by a wampa, but manages to escape using his lightsaber. In the frozen wasteland, he sees Obi-Wan's Force ghost, who tells him to travel to the planet Dagobah and complete his training with the Jedi Master Yoda. Luke collapses but is later rescued by Han. When the Empire discovers the Rebel base on Hoth, Luke leads his squadron of snowspeeders to battle the enemy's , but he is forced to retreat when his wingmen are overwhelmed. Escaping in his X-wing, he travels to Dagobah and meets Yoda. He undergoes rigorous Jedi training, quickly increasing his power in the Force.

During his training, Luke sees a vision of his friends in danger. Against both Obi-Wan and Yoda's advice to stay and complete his training, he travels to Bespin to save them, unwittingly falling into a trap set by Vader. He engages in a lightsaber duel with Vader. As his mentors warned, Luke proves to be no match for Vader; the Sith Lord easily overpowers Luke and severs his right hand. Vader then reveals that he is Luke's father, and offers him the chance to turn to the dark side of the Force and rule the galaxy at his side. Resolving that he would rather die than become an agent of evil, Luke throws himself into a deep reactor chasm. He survives, but is pulled into a garbage chute to the underside of Cloud City, and left hanging perilously onto a vane rod. Leia, flying away from Cloud City in the Millennium Falcon, senses Luke's call out to her with the Force, and turns the ship around to save him. Aboard the ship, he hears Vader telepathically telling him that it is his destiny to join the dark side. Luke's severed hand is replaced with a bio-mechanical one.

Return of the Jedi (1983)

One year later, Luke is a Jedi Knight, and has constructed his own lightsaber. He returns to Tatooine with Leia, Chewbacca, the droids, and Lando Calrissian to save Han, frozen in carbonite, from the crime lord Jabba the Hutt. Luke offers to negotiate with Jabba, who rejects his offer and casts him into a pit to battle a rancor. When Luke kills the rancor, he, Han, and Chewbacca are sentenced to death in the sarlacc pit. Luke escapes with R2-D2's help, saving his friends and destroying Jabba's sail barge.

Luke returns to Dagobah, and learns from a dying Yoda that Vader is indeed his father. Luke then learns from Obi-Wan's spirit that he has a twin sister, whom he immediately realizes is princess Leia. Both Jedi Masters tell Luke that he must face Vader again to finish his training and save the galaxy, but he is disturbed by the idea of killing his own father.

Arriving on Endor as part of a Rebel commando squad, Luke surrenders to Vader in an attempt to bring his father back from the dark side of the Force. Vader brings Luke to the second Death Star orbiting around Endor, where his master, Emperor Palpatine, tries to tempt Luke to the dark side, revealing his plan to destroy the Rebel fleet. Luke lashes out at the Emperor with his lightsaber, but Vader blocks his strike, and father and son once again duel with each other. Luke regains control of his emotions until Vader senses that Luke has a sister, and threatens to turn her to the dark side if Luke will not submit. Luke snaps and overpowers Vader, severing his father's mechanical right hand. The Emperor orders Luke to kill Vader and take his place. Luke looks at his own bionic hand and realizes that he is on the verge of suffering his father's fate. He casts his lightsaber aside, declaring himself a Jedi.

Furious, the Emperor tortures Luke with Force lightning. In agony, Luke calls out to his father for help; unwilling to let his son die, Vader throws the Emperor down a reactor shaft to his death, but is mortally wounded by the Emperor's Force lightning in the process. As Rebel fighters head toward the second Death Star's main reactor, Luke removes Vader's mask and looks upon his father's real face for the first and last time. The redeemed Anakin Skywalker reassures Luke that there was good in him after all, and to tell his sister that he was right about him, before dying peacefully. On Endor, Luke burns his father's body on a funeral pyre, giving him a proper Jedi funeral. During the Rebels' victory celebrations on Endor, Luke sees his father's spirit appear alongside those of Obi-Wan and Yoda.

Prequel trilogy

Revenge of the Sith (2005)
In the prequel film Revenge of the Sith (2005), during the waning days of the Clone Wars between the Galactic Republic and the Separatists, Senator Padmé Amidala, wife of Jedi Knight Anakin Skywalker, becomes pregnant with Luke and Leia. Anakin has a prophetic vision of Padmé dying in childbirth, and allows Chancellor Palpatine –  secretly the Sith Lord Darth Sidious – to corrupt him to the dark side as Darth Vader. 

After Vader uses the dark side to choke her, Padmé is taken to Polis Massa, where she gives birth to Luke and Leia and dies, having lost the will to live after Vader's betrayal. Obi-Wan and Yoda agree to separate the twins in order to protect them from the Sith and the newly created Galactic Empire. Obi-Wan takes Luke to the desert planet Tatooine, where he is adopted by Vader's stepbrother, Owen Lars, and his wife, Beru, while Leia is adopted by Senator Bail Organa of Alderaan. The infant Luke is portrayed by Aidan Barton, the son of Roger Barton, an editor of the film.

Sequel trilogy

The Force Awakens (2015)

In the first installment of the sequel trilogy, The Force Awakens (2015), the opening crawl reveals that Luke Skywalker had mysteriously vanished some time in the 30 years after the destruction of the second Death Star. Luke went into hiding after his nephew and apprentice, Ben Solo, turned to the dark side and became Kylo Ren, chief enforcer of the tyrannical First Order and its leader, Snoke. When Ren killed all of his fellow apprentices and ushered in the fall of the New Republic, Luke felt responsible, and disappeared. At the end of the film, the Resistance, led by Leia, manage to reconstruct a map, which traces the location of the temple from the Empire's archives to his location, and he is subsequently found on the planet Ahch-To by the young scavenger, Rey, who presents him with the lightsaber previously wielded by both Luke and his father.

The Art of Star Wars: The Last Jedi notes that Luke's exile is a reversal from his decision to help his friends in The Empire Strikes Back.

The Last Jedi (2017)
In The Last Jedi (2017), Luke throws the lightsaber away after Rey gives it to him. He then seals himself in his home, refusing to talk to Rey. However, when he sees Chewbacca without Han and that Rey came on the Millennium Falcon, he inquires about what has gone on with his family. Rey informs Luke about Solo's death at the hands of Kylo Ren and that the First Order has risen to rule the galaxy. Rey asks Luke to train her in the ways of the Force. Luke is initially reluctant to train Rey, telling her that it is time for the Jedi Order to end.

After some persuasion from R2-D2, however, Luke starts training Rey, but grows increasingly afraid of her power. Luke then tells Rey the history of the Jedi Order, how Darth Sidious rose to power and how the Jedi were partly responsible for his father's fall to the dark side. Luke also initially tells Rey that Ben was corrupted by Snoke, and destroyed the Jedi Temple he confronted his treasonous nephew. Ultimately, however, Luke tells Rey the truth: He had briefly considered killing the sleeping Ben after seeing a vision of the destruction he could cause, but immediately relented; Ben woke to see Luke with his lightsaber drawn and turned to the dark side because he felt betrayed. Upon learning this, Rey urges Luke to help her redeem Ben, but he refuses to participate in this nor help the Resistance. When Rey leaves, an embittered Luke tries to burn the Jedi temple, but fails. He is then visited by the spirit of Yoda, who assures Luke that he still has a purpose.

Luke appears on the planet Crait, as the Resistance are staging a standoff against the First Order, and he apologizes to Leia for allowing Ben to fall to the dark side. Luke steps in front of the First Order walkers, and unexpectedly survives an onslaught of blaster fire ordered by Ren. Ren charges at Luke in hand-to-hand combat, seemingly bisecting him with his lightsaber, but Luke remains unscathed; still on Ahch-To, Luke has sent a projection of himself to Crait, using the Force. This distraction allows the Resistance to escape the planet. Luke tells Kylo that he will not be the last Jedi before his projection disappears. On Ahch-To, Luke collapses then looks off in the horizon to see the planet's two suns setting before he becomes one with the Force and vanishes.

The Rise of Skywalker (2019)
Luke appears briefly in The Rise of Skywalker, the ninth and final chapter of the main series. When Rey discovers her lineage as the resurrected Palpatine's granddaughter, she exiles herself on Ahch-To, just as Luke had. Meaning to isolate herself, she throws Luke's lightsaber towards the burning wreckage of Ren's TIE whisper, in which she had traveled to her new home. Luke appears as a Force spirit, and reprimands Rey for treating the lightsaber with disrespect. Luke then admits that he was wrong not to participate in the Resistance, and thanks Rey for helping him rediscover himself. Luke convinces Rey to not view herself as a Palpatine, but as the good person Leia saw her as when training her, and not to give up on her battle against the Sith. Luke lends Rey his old T-65B X-wing Red Five and tells Rey to combine his father's lightsaber with Leia's in her battle on Exegol. He also restrengthened Rey when she reached out to and heard the voices of the past Jedi to help her destroyed Palpatine once and for all.

After Rey vanquishes Palpatine once and for all, she visits the moisture farm on Tatooine where Luke was raised. She buries Luke and Leia's lightsabers, revealing that she has constructed her own. A local asks Rey who she is. As Leia, who died earlier, and Luke appear as Force spirits, Rey names herself Rey Skywalker.

Television series
At the end of the Star Wars Rebels episode "Twin Suns", the silhouette of a young Luke Skywalker is seen from afar by Obi-Wan Kenobi.

Luke appears in the animated Disney micro-series Star Wars Forces of Destiny (with Hamill reprising his role). The episode "The Path Ahead" details him training with Yoda on Dagobah. He also appears in the episode "Traps and Tribulations", which takes place shortly after the Battle of Endor and shows him and Leia assisting the Ewoks in stopping a rampaging monster known as a Gorax.

Luke appears in "Chapter 16: The Rescue", the season two finale of The Mandalorian, after Grogu contacted him via the Force in a previous episode. Luke arrives on Moff Gideon's cruiser and destroys all of the Dark Troopers, saving Grogu and his guardian, Din Djarin, as well as their companions. Luke then takes Grogu with him to train him as a Jedi, with Djarin's permission. 

Luke appears in the sixth episode, "Chapter 6: From the Desert Comes a Stranger", of the spin-off series The Book of Boba Fett. While training Grogu, he helps him remember some of his past, including his home at the Jedi Temple on Coruscant and the events of the Great Jedi Purge. Djarin comes to visit Grogu, but decides against it after speaking with Ahsoka Tano, not wanting to hinder his training; however, he gives Ahsoka a gift to deliver to Grogu: beskar chain mail forged by the Armorer. Ahsoka gives the chain mail to Luke, who confesses that he is unsure whether Grogu is fully committed to the Jedi path and that he does not know how to handle the matter. Following Ahsoka's advice to listen to his instincts, Luke decides to let Grogu choose his own destiny by asking him to choose between the chain mail and the lightsaber of his old master, Yoda. In the seventh episode, "Chapter 7: In The Name of Honour", it is revealed that Grogu chose the chain mail, leading Luke to send him back to Djarin. He places him in his X-wing starfighter, which is then flown to Tatooine by R2-D2, where Grogu and Djarin are eventually reunited.

Video games
Luke is a playable character in Star Wars Battlefront II, and in the online multiplayer of Star Wars Battlefront.

He is a playable character in every Lego Star Wars video game to date, except for Lego Star Wars: The Video Game. 

An older and wiser Luke Skywalker also appears in the Jedi Knight II: Jedi Outcast and Jedi Knight: Jedi Academy video games at the rank of Jedi Master. In Jedi Outcast, Luke helps Kyle Katarn in his fight against Desann and Empire Reborn by driving them away from the Valley of the Jedi. Luke appears in the game Star Wars: The Force Unleashed in a downloadable alternate storyline where Starkiller duels Luke. He also appears in the Disney Lucasfilm video game Star Wars Commander. Luke is also a playable character in Disney Infinity 3.0, and a playable character to unlock for a limited time in Disney Magic Kingdoms.

Literature
Luke is the main character of the novel Heir to the Jedi and the junior novel The Legends of Luke Skywalker (the latter of which was adapted as a manga). He is also a main character of the 2015 comic Star Wars, which takes place between the films of the original trilogy.

 Heir to the Jedi Star Wars: Heir to the Jedi was announced as one of the first four canon novels to be released in 2014 and 2015. Set between A New Hope and The Empire Strikes Back, Heir to the Jedi chronicles the adventures of Luke as he continues to battle the Empire with his Rebel friends, grows close with fellow Rebel Nakari Kelen, and begins to develop his Force abilities. The novel is written from the first-person perspective of Luke, and is only the second Star Wars novel to attempt this type of narrative voice.

 Shadow of the Sith Star Wars: Shadow of the Sith'' is a novel set between Return of the Jedi and The Force Awakens. The book follows Luke and Lando Calrissian on a mission to locate Exegol.

Legends

In April 2014, most of the licensed Star Wars novels and comics produced since the originating 1977 film Star Wars were rebranded by Lucasfilm as Star Wars Legends and declared non-canon to the franchise. The Legends-branded novels, comic books and video games detail Luke's exploits following Return of the Jedi.

Novels
In the novel The Truce at Bakura, set one day after the battle of Endor, Luke and his friend Wedge Antilles recover a message droid from the titular planet, which was being invaded by the Ssi-Ruuk. Luke commands a task force, turning back the enemy army. He also meets Dev Sibwarra, a Force-sensitive human who had been captured by the Ssi-Ruuk, who is killed in the battle after turning against his captors.

In the novel The Courtship of Princess Leia, set four years after the Battle of Endor, Luke travels to the planet Dathomir. There, he discovers a group of Force-sensitive witches called the Witches of Dathomir, banded into two separate groups: a collective of benign, matriarchal clans; the one he is in contact with being the Singing Mountain Clan, and the witches who have turned to the dark side, called the Nightsisters. Discovering a prophecy in which it was told a Jedi would change the way of life on the land, Luke eventually realizes truly what the Force is for the first time in his life. While there, he destroys most of the Nightsisters (including their powerful leader, Gethzirion, and the galaxy's most powerful remaining warlord, Warlord Zsinj). Thanks to the help of the prophecy and witches, Luke recovers old Jedi records left by Yoda about 400 years prior. He decides to start a new Jedi Academy, something he has been trying to do for six months before the start of the novel by finding old Jedi records and archives.

In the Thrawn trilogy, Luke meets former Emperor's Hand Mara Jade, who is bound by Palpatine's disembodied voice that repeatedly commands "You will kill Luke Skywalker". Mara Jade is working with her boss, a fringe-of-the-galaxy smuggler named Talon Karrde, who also plays a crucial role in this era. Although she was ready to fulfill that order to stop the voice, circumstances force her to keep him alive long enough to have him help escape a mutual danger. Despite her threats, Luke learns of the spell Mara is under and vows to free her from it. Meanwhile, the rest of the New Republic is fighting against Grand Admiral Thrawn, and thanks to Leia's help, he is eventually defeated, although several times Luke had to avoid getting captured by Thrawn or seduced by his ally, Joruus C'baoth. Eventually, the he and Jade fights against Luke's clone, Luuke Skywalker, C'baoth's creation. During the fight, Mara Jade destroys the clone and, with Leia's help, destroys C'baoth. This entire time, C'baoth has been obsessed with "molding" Luke and Mara to serve him, perhaps due to the fact that the Spaarti cloning cylinders he was made from have a reputation of turning people insane later in life. Nonetheless, C'baoth is defeated by Mara along with Luuke, and Mara's acts silences her curse and completes her reconciliation with the Jedi, whom she later joins.

In the Jedi Academy trilogy, Luke resigns his commission in the New Republic's starfighter corps to pursue his Jedi studies and rebuild the Jedi Order in the Massassi Temple on Yavin 4, a decision some anti-Jedi politicians use against him. Luke becomes the New Jedi Order's leader. His students in the ways of the Force include; Gantoris, Kam Solusar, Tionne, Streen, Cilghal, Kirana Ti and others. He is forced to contend with the spirit of ancient Sith Lord Exar Kun, who lures one of his most powerful students, Kyp Durron, to the dark side.

In the Hand of Thrawn Duology, Luke, now a Jedi Master, works again with Mara Jade, who has learned to better her Force knowledge since her training at Luke's Jedi Academy. He falls in love with her and they eventually marry. Later, in Edge of Victory: Rebirth, they have a son whom they name Ben, after Obi-Wan Kenobi's pseudonym.

In the New Jedi Order series, Luke creates a New Jedi Council. He idealises a new conclave, made up of Jedi, politicians and military officers. In Force Heretic: Remnant, he spearheads the mission into the Unknown Regions during the Yuuzhan Vong invasion to find the mysterious planet of Zonama Sekot, a planet that creates living starships. After the invasion is defeated with the help of the new Mandalorian Warriors, a Sekotian fleet and a Galactic Alliance-Imperial Remnant fleet, Luke leads the New Jedi Order on Denon, the temporary capital of the Galactic Alliance and the site of the newly rebuilt Jedi Temple on Coruscant. In The Swarm War, the New Jedi Order moves to Ossus, the site of Jedi temples and libraries that were mostly destroyed 4,000 years prior. Upon the Killik's invasion of Chiss space and the transformation of most of the Myrkr mission survivors into Killik Joiners, Luke determines that the Killik's collective mind is being unconsciously controlled by a hive called the Dark Nest. The Dark Nest is controlled by a former Nightsister named Lomi Plo, who became their Unseen Queen with her ability to become invisible by exploiting the doubts of inferiors. 

One of the Myrkr mission survivors, Alema Rar, attempts to plant seeds of doubt in Luke's mind by suggesting that his wife, Mara, may be somehow responsible for the death of his mother, Padmé Amidala, which he almost believes because of Mara's previous role as the Emperor's Hand. This allows Lomi to escape from Luke, who discovers recordings of his father Force-choking his mother on Mustafar, his own birth, and his mother's death hidden inside R2-D2's memory drive. Because of this, he is able to overcome his doubts about Mara and defeat Lomi Plo in the final battle of the Swarm War, cutting her into four pieces. 

Luke creates a New Jedi Council, and becomes the Grand Master of the New Jedi Order. He tells the Jedi to either follow his leadership, make the order their priority, or leave. Luke is also forced to exile the Padawans Tahiri, Lowbacca, and Tesar Sebatayne to Dagobah for divulging secret information to people outside the order.

In the Legacy of the Force series, Luke begins having visions of a figure cloaked in darkness destroying the galaxy and the Jedi. Luke is troubled that he has been unable to discern the identity of this figure, who seems to be much like Darth Vader. Complicating matters even more is the recent schism that has developed between Luke and his nephew, Jacen Solo. Already a tremendously powerful Jedi Knight, Jacen has begun adopting radical interpretations of the Force, causing a dramatic change in his personality. Luke fears that Jacen is pursuing the same path that ultimately led to Anakin Skywalker's fall to the dark side. 

In Bloodlines, the situation worsens when Luke's son, Ben, becomes Jacen's apprentice. Luke must also battle his wife, who refuses to confront Jacen for fear of alienating Ben. In Tempest, Luke determines that the dark figure from his dreams is Lumiya, a former Emperor's Hand now known as the "Dark Lady of the Sith". When Mara is murdered in Sacrifice, Lumiya deceives Luke into believing that she killed her. They battle again, and Luke saves a weaponless Lumiya from falling to her death simply so that he can kill her himself. Luke returns to Coruscant where he is found by Ben, standing guard over Mara's body; upon speaking with his son, he realizes that Lumiya could not have killed her. Later in his private cabin, Luke breaks down over the death of his wife, knowing that her murderer is still at large. He does not realize that the killer is his own nephew, Jacen, who has now taken the Sith name Darth Caedus. In Revelation, Ben proves that Jacen killed Mara, but Luke is now reluctant to kill Jacen out of fear that he or his son will fall to the dark side in the process. The decision is taken out of his hands in Invincible, when Jaina kills Jacen in a final lightsaber duel.

In Fate of the Jedi novels, set about 40 years after the first film, Luke Skywalker, now in his early sixties, is deposed by the government from his position as Grand Master, and exiled from Coruscant. However, if he finds the reason of why Jacen Solo fell to the dark side, he can be allowed to return. Ben insists on coming with him. Together, father and son explore dangerous and little-known portions of the galaxy. Luke and Ben learn much about each other, about the Force, and about the great dangers threatening the Jedi. The great love the two surviving Skywalkers have for each other grows even greater as they repeatedly save each other's lives and explore the limits and powers and mysteries of the Force.

Luke Skywalker and the Shadows of Mindor
Luke Skywalker and the Shadows of Mindor is a standalone novel that chronicles the Battle of Mindor, a fictional event in the Star Wars expanded universe. The novel was written by Matthew Stover and released in December 2008.

The novel is set shortly after Return of the Jedi and the novel Prophets of the Dark Side, with Luke Skywalker and the Rebel Alliance attempting to stop Lord Shadowspawn and his "shadow stormtroopers", culminating in the Battle of Mindor. Matthew Stover has said on his personal weblog, 

Comic books
Luke Skywalker appears in the Marvel-published Star Wars comics adaptations of the original trilogy, as well as an ongoing series that ran from 1977 to 1986. When Dark Horse acquired the license two years later, he appeared in numerous projects based on the franchise as well. In Star Wars: Legacy, set 125 years after the events of the original films, Luke appears as a spirit in the Force to his descendant Cade Skywalker and persuades him to once again become a Jedi in order to defeat the evil Darth Krayt and his burgeoning Sith Empire.

 Characterization 

 Psychoanalytic 
Each of the Star Wars characters instantiates one of the archetypes in Joseph Campbell's hero's journey, with Luke Skywalker filling the hero archetype. As such, he is a relatable protagonist who encounters the basic struggle between good and evil in the same way as other heroic figures such as Harry Potter, Bilbo Baggins, and Jesus Christ. Luke's central dilemma is the ongoing war between good and evil, both externally and internally.

 Religious 
Some argue that Luke mirrors fundamental values of Christianity and Abrahamic religion; Luke's journey is often compared to that of Jesus Christ. Scholars argue that Luke is a Christ-like figure, while Yoda represents a god, and Darth Vader represents the temptations of evil. Luke's struggle between good and evil is contrasted with that of his father, Anakin Skywalker, in a way that represents the story of the Prodigal Son.

Reception
In 2015, Luke Skywalker was selected by Empire magazine as the 50th-greatest movie character of all time. Empire also ranked him as the third greatest Star Wars character. Luke was also on the ballot for the American Film Institute's 100 Years...100 Heroes and Villains. On their list of the 100 Greatest Fictional Characters, Fandomania.com ranked Luke at number 14. IGN listed Luke as their 4th top Star Wars character, and he was chosen twice by IGN's readers as one of their favorite Star Wars characters. IGN's Jesse Schedeen also picked Luke Skywalker as one of the characters they most wanted to appear on the Wii, as well as listing Skywalker as one of their favorite Star Wars heroes. Schedeen also listed the character as one of the Star Wars characters they wanted to see in Soulcalibur. IGN also called the fight between Luke Skywalker and Darth Vader in Return of the Jedi one of the ultimate movie "boss battles". In a feature on speeches made by Luke Skywalker, IGN's Todd Gilchrist said that his favorite of Luke's speeches is "I am a Jedi, like my father before me". UGO Networks listed Luke as one of their best heroes of all time, and he was voted as one of the coolest Star Wars characters by UGO's readers. Inventor Dean Kamen has also code-named his new prosthetic arm system "Luke" in honor of the character. One indication of the character's impact on fans is an elaborate fan theory, developed on the Internet since 2015, that there are actually two different Lukes in the original trilogy: the normal one and a "bigger Luke" of a slightly larger build who appears in some scenes.

Mark Hamill was nominated a Saturn Award for Best Actor in for his portrayal of Luke Skywalker in Star Wars, and won the award for his portrayal in The Empire Strikes Back, Return of the Jedi, and The Last Jedi.

In 1976, Hamill was in a serious car accident after filming Star Wars, which involved an operation on his face. It was speculated that the Wampa attack at the beginning of The Empire Strikes Back was written in to explain his facial injuries, but George Lucas specifically disputed this in the DVD commentary of The Empire Strikes Back.

In regards to Luke's portrayal in The Last Jedi, many fans expressed disappointment in how he was depicted "as a grumpy old man whose failures had driven him into hiding" and the actions the character takes in contributing to Kylo Ren's backstory, a stark departure in how Luke was characterized in the original trilogy. Hamill originally stated that he "pretty much fundamentally [disagreed] with every choice [The Last Jedi director Rian Johnson] made for this character," but that he had the utmost respect for Johnson and was willing to do his part to realize Johnson's vision. While regarding the possibility of a younger actor playing the role, Hamill expressed support towards Sebastian Stan, whose physical resemblance to a young Hamill went viral. However he noted that child actor Jacob Tremblay would be his top choice if the story were to be focused on a very young Luke.

In 2016, when asked about the character's sexual orientation and if Luke could be gay, Hamill said Luke's sexual orientation "is meant to be interpreted by the viewer." He added, "if you think Luke is gay, of course he is. You should not be ashamed of it. Judge Luke by his character, not by who he loves." Hamill later said that he considered the possibility that Luke could have found love between Return of the Jedi and The Force Awakens.

Cultural impact
Luke Skywalker remains an American cultural icon. He is often used by child psychotherapists to help children to project their thoughts and state of being in a way that is understandable to both the child and their therapist. Another way that therapists utilize Star Wars in sessions is to teach their patients that the Force represents the self-understanding that they achieve in therapy. Children are taught that they are Luke and their therapist is Obi-Wan, in that eventually, as Luke no longer needed his mentor, they will one day no longer need their therapist.

Star Wars has been related back to cultural events of its time, such as the Cold War and Nixon-era politics. The severing of Luke's hand and Darth Vader's bionic presence supposedly, according to space.com, symbolize the unity of the military and amputees.

Relationships
Family tree

Mentorship tree

ReferencesFootnotesCitations'''

Further reading

External links

 
 
 Luke Skywalker on IMDb

Notes 

Adoptee characters in films
Characters created by George Lucas
Fictional amputees
Fictional characters with precognition
Fictional commanders
Fictional energy swordfighters
Fictional farmers
Fictional fighter pilots
Fictional generals
Fictional ghosts
Fictional hermits
Fictional martial arts trainers
Fictional military lieutenants
Fictional military personnel in films
Fictional revolutionaries
Fictional space pilots
Fictional twins
Fictional war veterans
Film characters introduced in 1977
Male characters in film
Fictional soldiers
Star Wars characters who are Force-sensitive
Star Wars comics characters
Star Wars literary characters
Star Wars Jedi characters
Star Wars Skywalker Saga characters
Star Wars television characters
Star Wars video game characters
The Mandalorian characters
The Book of Boba Fett characters